Janeil Candis Bellille (born 18 June 1989 in Chaguanas) is a Trinidadian hurdler. She represented her country at the 2012 and 2016 Summer Olympics.

International competitions

1Did not finish in the final

Personal bests
Outdoor
400 metres – 51.83 (Port of Spain 2014)
400 metres hurdles – 55.41 (Fayetteville 2014)
Indoor
200 metres – 23.87 (College Station 2014)
400 metres – 52.58 (College Station 2014)

External links 

 

Living people
1989 births
Trinidad and Tobago female hurdlers
Olympic athletes of Trinidad and Tobago
Athletes (track and field) at the 2012 Summer Olympics
Athletes (track and field) at the 2016 Summer Olympics
Commonwealth Games competitors for Trinidad and Tobago
Athletes (track and field) at the 2014 Commonwealth Games
Pan American Games competitors for Trinidad and Tobago
Athletes (track and field) at the 2007 Pan American Games
Athletes (track and field) at the 2015 Pan American Games
Texas A&M Aggies women's track and field athletes
Central American and Caribbean Games silver medalists for Trinidad and Tobago
Central American and Caribbean Games bronze medalists for Trinidad and Tobago
Competitors at the 2010 Central American and Caribbean Games
Competitors at the 2018 Central American and Caribbean Games
Central American and Caribbean Games medalists in athletics